Clement Attlee was invited by King George VI to form the Attlee ministry in the United Kingdom in July 1945, succeeding Winston Churchill as Prime Minister of the United Kingdom. The Labour Party had won a landslide victory at the 1945 general election, and went on to enact policies of what became known as the post-war consensus, including the establishment of the welfare state and the nationalisation of some industries. The government's spell in office was marked by post-war austerity measures, the violent crushing of pro-independence and communist movements in Malaya, the grant of independence to India, the engagement in the Cold War against Soviet Communism as well as the creation of the country's National Health Service (NHS). 

Attlee went on to win a narrow majority of five seats at the 1950 general election, forming the second Attlee ministry. Just twenty months after that election, Attlee called a new election for 25 October 1951 in an attempt to gain a larger majority, but was narrowly defeated by the Conservative Party, sending Labour into a 13-year spell in opposition.

Leaders
The Labour Party came to power in the United Kingdom following its unexpected victory in the July 1945 general election. Party leader Clement Attlee became Prime Minister replacing Winston Churchill in late July. Ernest Bevin was Foreign Secretary until shortly before his death in April 1951. Hugh Dalton became Chancellor of the Exchequer, but had to resign in 1947, while James Chuter Ede was Home Secretary for the whole duration of the Attlee ministries' stay in power.

Other notable figures in the government included: Herbert Morrison, Deputy Prime Minister and Leader of the House of Commons, who replaced Bevin as Foreign Secretary in March 1951; Sir Stafford Cripps was initially President of the Board of Trade but replaced Dalton as Chancellor of the Exchequer in 1947; Hugh Gaitskell held several minor posts before replacing Cripps as Chancellor in 1950; Nye Bevan was Minister of Health; Arthur Greenwood was Lord Privy Seal and Paymaster General while future Prime Minister Harold Wilson became the youngest member of the cabinet in the 20th century (at the age of 31) when he was made President of the Board of Trade in 1947. The most notable of the few female members of the government was Ellen Wilkinson, who was Minister of Education until her early death in 1947.

Policies

It was an "age of austerity", as wartime rationing was continued despite the Allied Forces' victory, and was even expanded upon to include bread. Living conditions were poor; instead of expansion, the country's task was to replace the national wealth destroyed or used up during the war. The Great Depression did not return, and full employment was created. Returning veterans were successfully reabsorbed into the postwar society. The Attlee government nationalised about 20% of the economy, including coal, railways, road transport, the Bank of England, civil aviation, electricity and gas, and steel.  However, there was no money for investment to modernise these industries, and there was no effort made to turn control over to union members. The Attlee government greatly expanded the welfare state, with the National Health Service Act 1946, which nationalised the hospitals and provided for free universal healthcare. The National Insurance Act 1946 provided sickness and unemployment benefits for adults, plus retirement pensions. The National Assistance Act 1948 provided a safety net for anyone not otherwise covered. More council housing was built, and plans were made through the New Towns Act 1946 for the growth of suburbs, and to reduce overcrowding in major cities such as London and Glasgow. Since there was little money for detailed planning, the government adopted Keynesianism, which allowed for planning in the sense of overall control of the national deficit and surplus. Two laws written by the Conservatives during the war were expanded, the Family Allowances Act 1945 and the Education Act 1944.

The Transport Act 1947 established the British Transport Commission, which took over control of the railways from the Big Four—Great Western Railway, London, Midland and Scottish Railway, London and North Eastern Railway and the Southern Railway—to form British Railways.

In foreign affairs, the government was active in the United Nations and negotiated a $5 billion loan from the United States and Canada in 1946. It eagerly joined the Marshall Plan in 1948. It could no longer afford to support the Greek government and encouraged the U.S. to take its place through the Truman Doctrine in 1947. It took an active role in joining the United States in the Cold War and forming NATO. It gave independence to India, Pakistan, Ceylon and Burma and moved to strengthen the British Commonwealth.

Nationalisation projects
1945–51 The Labour Party comes to power with a programme for nationalising the essential sectors of the economy, some of which had been weakened during wartime: finance, heavy industry and natural resources, along with communication and transportation infrastructure.
1946 Coal industry under the National Coal Board.
 Bank of England. 
 National Health Service created (with separate units in England, Wales, and Scotland and for Northern Ireland) taking over hospitals and making medical services free. NHS started operations in 1948.
1947 British Electricity Authority and area electricity boards.
 Cable & Wireless.
1948 National rail, inland (not marine) water transport, some road haulage, some road passenger transport and Thomas Cook & Son under the British Transport Commission. Separate elements operated as British Railways, British Road Services, and British Waterways.
1949 Local authority gas supply undertakings in England, Scotland and Wales.
1951 Iron and Steel Corporation of Great Britain (privatised by the Conservative Government in 1955, and renationalised by Labour in 1967 as British Steel Corporation).

Social policies

Health

Attlee's Health Minister, Aneurin Bevan, fought hard against the general disapproval of the medical establishment, including the British Medical Association, by creating the National Health Service in 1948. This was a publicly funded healthcare system, which offered treatment for all, regardless of income, free of charge at the point of use. Reflecting pent-up demand that had long existed for medical services, the NHS treated some 8,500,000 dental patients and dispensed more than 5,000,000 pairs of spectacles during its first year of operation.

Consultants benefited from the new system by being paid salaries that provided an acceptable standard of living without the need for them to resort to private practice. The NHS brought major improvements in the health of working-class people, with deaths from diphtheria, pneumonia, and tuberculosis significantly reduced. Although there were often disputes about its organisation and funding, British political parties continued to voice their general support for the NHS in order to remain electable.

In the field of health care, funds were allocated to modernisation and extension schemes aimed at improving administrative efficiency. Improvements were made in nursing accommodation in order to recruit more nurses and reduce labour shortages which were keeping 60,000 beds out of use, and efforts were made to reduce the imbalance "between an excess of fever and tuberculosis (TB) beds and a shortage of maternity beds".

BCG vaccinations were introduced for the protection of medical students, midwives, nurses, and contacts of patients with tuberculosis, a pension scheme was set up for employees of the newly established NHS, and the Radioactive Substances Act 1948 set out general provisions to control radioactive substances. Numerous lesser reforms were also introduced, some of which were of great benefit to certain segments of British society, such as the mentally deficient and the blind. Between 1948 and 1951, Attlee's government increased spending on health from £6,000,000,000 to £11,000,000,000: an increase of over 80%, and from 2.1% to 3.6% of GDP.

Welfare
The government set about implementing the Wartime plans of  William Beveridge's plans for the creation of a 'cradle to grave' welfare state, and set in place an entirely new system of social security. Among the most important pieces of legislation was the National Insurance Act 1946, in which people in work paid a flat rate of national insurance. In return, they (and the wives of male contributors) were eligible for flat-rate pensions, sickness benefit, unemployment benefit, and funeral benefit. Various other pieces of legislation provided for child benefit and support for people with no other source of income. In 1949, unemployment, sickness and maternity benefits were exempted from taxation.

A block grant introduced in 1948 helped the social services provided by local authorities. Personal Social Services or welfare services were developed in 1948 for individual and families in general, particularly special groups such as the mentally disordered, deprived children, the elderly, and the handicapped.

The Attlee Government increased pensions and other benefits, with pensions raised to become more of a living income than they had ever been. War pensions and allowances (for both World Wars) were increased by an Act of 1946 which gave the wounded man with an allowance for his wife and children if he married after he had been wounded, thereby removing a grievance of more than twenty years standing. Other improvements were made in war pensions during Attlee's tenure as prime minister. A Constant Attendance Allowance was tripled, an Unemployability Allowance was tripled from 10s to 30s a week, and a special hardship allowance of up to £1 a week was introduced. In addition, the 1951 Budget made further improvements in the supplementary allowances for many war pensioners. From 1945 onwards, three out of every four pension claims had been successful, whilst after the First World War only one pension claim in three was allowed. Under the Superannuation (Miscellaneous Provisions) Act 1948, employees of a body representative of local authorities or of the officers of local authorities could be admitted "on suitable terms to the superannuation fund of a local authority." In 1951, a comforts allowance was introduced that was automatically paid to war pensioners "receiving unemployability supplement and constant attendance allowance."

A more extensive system of social welfare benefits was established by the Attlee Government, which did much to reduce acute social deprivation. The cumulative impact of the Attlee's Government's health and welfare policies was such that all the indices of health (such as statistics of school medical or dental officers, or of medical officers of health) showed signs of improvement, with continual improvements in survival rates for infants and increased life expectancy for the elderly. The success of the Attlee Government's welfare legislation in reducing poverty was such that, in the general election of 1950, according to one study, "Labour propaganda could make much of the claim that social security had eradicated the most abject destitution of the 1930s".

Housing and planning
The New Towns Act 1946 set up development corporations to construct new towns, while the Town and Country Planning Act 1947 instructed county councils to prepare development plans and also provided compulsory purchase powers. The Attlee Government also extended the powers of local authorities to requisition houses and parts of houses, and made the acquisition of land less difficult than before. The Housing (Scotland) Act 1949 provided grants of 75% (87.5% in the Highlands and Islands) towards modernisation costs payable by the Treasury to local authorities.

In 1949, local authorities were empowered to provide people suffering from poor health with public housing at subsidised rents.

To assist home ownership, the limit on the amount of money that people could borrow from their local authority in order to purchase or build a home was raised from £800 to £1,500 in 1945, and to £5,000 in 1949. Under the National Assistance Act 1948, local authorities had a duty "to provide emergency temporary accommodation for families which become homeless through no fault of their own."

A large house-building programme was carried out with the intention of providing millions of people with high-quality homes. A Housing (Financial and Miscellaneous Provisions) Act 1946increased Treasury subsidies for the construction of local authority housing in England and Wales. Four out of five houses constructed under Labour were council properties built to more generous specifications than before the Second World War, and subsidies kept down council rents. Altogether, these policies provided public-sector housing with its biggest ever boost up until that point, while low-wage earners particularly benefited from these developments. Although the Attlee Government failed to meet its targets, primarily due to economic constraints, over 1,000,000 new homes were built between 1945 and 1951 (a significant achievement under the circumstances) which ensured that decent, affordable housing was available to many low-income families for the first time ever.

Development rights were nationalised while the government attempted to take all development profits for the state. Strong planning authorities were set up to control land use, and issued manuals of guidance which stressed the importance of safeguarding agricultural land. A strong chain of regional offices was set up within its planning ministry to provide a strong lead in regional development policies. Comprehensive Development Areas (CDAs), a designation under the Town and Country Planning Act 1947, allowed local authorities to acquire property in the designated areas using powers of compulsory purchase in order to re-plan and develop urban areas suffering from urban blight or war damage.

Women and children
A number of reforms were embarked upon to improve conditions for women and children. In 1946, universal family allowances were introduced to provide financial support to households for raising children. These benefits had been legislated for the previous year by Churchill's Family Allowances Act 1945, and was the first measure pushed through parliament by Attlee's government. The Conservatives would later criticise Labour for having been "too hasty" in introducing family allowances.

The Married Women (Restraint Upon Anticipation) Act 1949 was passed in order to "to equalise, to render inoperative any restrictions upon anticipation or alienation attached to the enjoyment of property by a woman," while the Married Women (Maintenance) Act 1949 was enacted with the intention of improving the adequacy and duration of financial benefits for married women.

The Criminal Law (Amendment) Act 1950 amended the Criminal Law Amendment Act 1885 to bring prostitutes within the law and safeguard them from abduction and abuse. The Criminal Justice Act 1948 restricted imprisonment for juveniles and brought improvements to the probation and remand centre systems, while the passage of the Justices of the Peace Act 1949 led to extensive reforms of magistrates courts. The Attlee Government also abolished the marriage bar in the Civil Service, thereby enabling married women to work in that institution.

In 1946, the government set up a National Institute of Houseworkers as a means of providing a socially democratic variety of domestic service.

By late 1946, agreed standards of training were established, which was followed by the opening of a training headquarters and the opening of an additional nine training centres in Wales, Scotland, and then nationwide throughout Great Britain. The National Health Service Act 1946 indicated that domestic help should be provided for households where that help is required "owing to the presence of any person who is ill, lying-in, an expectant mother, mentally defective, aged or a child not over compulsory school age". 'Home help' therefore included the provision of home-helps for nursing and expectant mothers and for mothers with children under the age of five, and by 1952 some 20,000 women were engaged in this service.

Workers' rights
Various measures were carried out to improve conditions in the workplace. Entitlement to sick leave was greatly extended, and sick pay schemes were introduced for local authority administrative, professional and technical workers in 1946 and for various categories of manual workers in 1948. Workers' compensation was also significantly improved.

The Fair Wages Resolution of 1946 required any contractor working on a public project to at least match the pay rates and other employment conditions set in the appropriate collective agreement. In 1946, Purchase Tax was removed completely from kitchen fittings and crockery, while the rate was reduced on various gardening items.

The Fire Services Act 1947 introduced a new pension scheme for firefighters, while the Electricity Act 1947 introduced better retirement benefits for workers in that industry. The Workers' Compensation (Supplementation) Act 1948 and introduced benefits for workers with certain asbestos-related diseases which had occurred before 1948. The Merchant Shipping Act 1948 and the Merchant Shipping (Safety Convention) Act 1949 were passed to improve conditions for seamen. The Shops Act 1950 consolidated previous legislation which provided that no one could be employed in a shop for more than six hours without having a break for at least 20 minutes. The legislation also required a lunch break of at least 45 minutes for anyone for worked between 11:30am and 2:30pm, and a half-hour tea break for anyone working between 4pm and 7pm. The government also strengthened a Fair Wages Resolution, with a clause that required all employers getting government contracts to recognise the rights of their workers to join trade unions.

The Trades Disputes Act 1927 was repealed, and a Dock Labour Scheme was introduced in 1947 to put an end to the casual system of hiring labour in the docks. This scheme gave registered dockers the legal right to minimum work and decent conditions. Through the National Dock Labour Board (on which trade unions and employers had equal representation) the unions acquired control over recruitment and dismissal. Registered dockers laid off by employers within the Scheme had the right either to be taken on by another, or to generous compensation. All dockers were registered under the Dock Labour Scheme, giving them a legal right to minimum work, holidays and sick pay.

Wages for members of the police force were significantly increased. The introduction of a Miner's Charter in 1946 instituted a five-day work week for miners and a standardised day wage structure, and in 1948 a Colliery Workers Supplementary Scheme was approved, providing supplementary allowances to disabled coal-workers and their dependants. In 1948, a pension scheme was set up to provide pension benefits for employees of the new NHS, as well as their dependents. Under the Coal Industry Nationalisation (Superannuation) Regulations 1950, a pension scheme for mineworkers was established. Improvements were also made in farmworkers' wages, and the Agricultural Wages Board in 1948 not only safeguarded wage levels, but also ensured that workers were provided with accommodation.

A number of regulations aimed at safeguarding the health and safety of people at work were also introduced during Attlee's time in office. Regulations were issued in February 1946 applying to factories involved with "manufacturing briquettes or blocks of fuel consisting of coal, coal dust, coke or slurry with pitch as a binding .substance," and which concerned "dust and ventilation, washing facilities and clothing accommodation, medical supervision and examination, skin and eye protection and messrooms." The Coal Mines (Ventilation) General Regulations dated 17 May 1947 “implement recommendations of the Royal Commission on Safety in Coal Mines regarding two main topics: methods of checking periodically the general standard of ventilation and methods of minimising leakage of air. Provisions are laid down respecting determinations of firedamp content and methods by which these determinations are to be made.”  The Radioactive Substances Act, dated 30 June 1948, “ which regulates the importation, manufacture, sale, storage and use of radioactive substances, includes provisions empowering the appropriate Minister to issue regulations for the prevention of injuries to health caused by ionising radiations and for securing the safe disposal of radioactive waste products.” The Dry Cleaning Special Regulations, 1949 dated 29 November 1949 sought “to prohibit the use of liquids with a flash point below 32° C. (90° F.) from being used for dry cleaning otherwise than by spotting.” The Blasting (Castings and Other Articles) Special Regulations 1949, “prohibit sandblasting and deal with the blasting enclosure, the cleaning of used abrasive, ventilation plant, inspection, examination and maintenance of equipment, personal protective equipment and clothing, the cleaning of blasting equipment, the employment of young persons, and the reporting of defects in the equipment. Sandblasting is prohibited in Section 5, which reads: "No sand or other substance containing free silica shall be introduced as an abrasive into any blasting apparatus." The Chief Inspector is empowered to grant exemptions from the regulations.” UK: The matters dealt with by the Jute (Safety, Health and Welfare) Regulations dated 21 July 1948 “include the lifting and carrying of loads by women and young persons, ventilation, temperature and humidity, welfare, construction and use of machinery and sale and hire of machinery.” 

The Magnesium (Grinding of Castings and Other Articles) (Special Regulations) Order of December 1946 contained special measures "respecting the maintenance of plant and apparatus; precautions against causing sparks; the interception and removal of dust; automatic operation of appliances; protective clothing; and prohibition of smoking, open lights and fires." For those workers engaged in luminising processes, the Factories (Luminising) Special Regulations (1947) prohibited the employment of those under the age of 18 and ordered "an initial medical examination to be carried out before the seventh day of employment; subsequent examinations are to be carried out once a month."Under the terms of the Blasting (Castings and Other Articles) Special Regulations (1949) "no sand or other substance containing free silica is to be employed in any blasting process," while the Foundries (Parting Materials) Special Regulations (1950) prohibited the use of certain parting powders "which give rise to a substantial risk of silicosis."

The Building (Safety, Health & Welfare) Regulations 1948 required that measures should be taken to minimise exposure to potentially harmful dust or fumes, while the Pottery (Health) Special Regulations (1947) prohibited the use "except in the manufacture of glazed tiles" of all "but leadless or low solubility glazes and prescribe certain processes in which ground or powdered flint or quartz are not to be employed." The Pottery (Health and Welfare) Special Regulations 1950 made provision for the health and safety of workers employed in factories "in which there is carried on the manufacture or decoration of pottery or certain allied manufactures or processes."

Law
Various law reforms were also carried out by Attlee's government. The Criminal Justice Act 1948 provided for new methods to deal with offenders, and abolished hard labour, penal servitude, prison divisions and whipping. The Law Reform (Personal Injuries) Act 1948 enabled employees to sue their employers in cases where they experienced injury due to the negligence of a fellow employee. The Legal Aid and Advice Act 1949 introduced a state aided scheme to assist those who couldn't afford legal services.

Post-war consensus

Most historians argue that the main domestic policies (except nationalisation of steel) reflected a broad bipartisan consensus. The post-war consensus is a historians' model of political agreement from 1945 to the late-1970s.  In 1979 newly elected Prime Minister Margaret Thatcher rejected and reversed it.  The concept claims there was a widespread consensus that covered support for coherent package of policies that were developed in the 1930s, promised during the Second World War, and enacted under Attlee. The policies dealt with a mixed economy, Keynesianism, and a broad welfare state. In recent years the validity of the interpretation has been debated by historians.

The historians' model of the post-war consensus was most fully developed by Paul Addison. The basic argument is that in the 1930s, Liberal Party intellectuals led by John Maynard Keynes and William Beveridge developed a series of plans that became especially attractive as the wartime government promised a much better post-war Britain and saw the need to engage every sector of society. The coalition government during the war, headed by Churchill and Attlee, signed off on a series of white papers that promised Britain a much improved welfare state. After the war, the promises included the National Health Service, and expansion of education, housing, and a number of welfare programmes. It did not include the nationalisation of iron and steel, which was approved only by the Labour Party.

The model states that from 1945 until the arrival of Thatcher in 1979, there was a broad multi-partisan national consensus on social and economic policy, especially regarding the welfare state, nationalised health services, educational reform, a mixed economy, government regulation, Keynesian macroeconomic policies, and full employment. Apart from the question of nationalisation of some industries, these policies were broadly accepted by the three major parties, as well as by industry, the financial community and the labour movement. Until the 1980s, historians generally agreed on the existence and importance of the consensus. Some historians such as Ralph Miliband expressed disappointment that the consensus was a modest or even conservative package that blocked a fully socialized society.  Historian Angus Calder complained bitterly that the post-war reforms were an inadequate reward for the wartime sacrifices, and a cynical betrayal of the people's hope for a more just post-war society. In recent years, there has been a historiographical debate on whether such a consensus ever existed.

Fate
In the February 1950 general election the Labour Party narrowly maintained their majority by just 5 seats. This was insufficient to govern however, due to the Bevanite split causing tensions in the party. Another general election was called in 1951 to try and increase their majority. However, in the October 1951 general elections the Conservatives returned to power under Winston Churchill. Labour was to remain out of office for the next thirteen years, until 1964, when Harold Wilson became Prime Minister.

Cabinets

First Attlee ministry

1945–1950
Clement Attlee: Prime Minister and Minister of Defence
Herbert Morrison: Deputy Prime Minister, Lord President of the Council and Leader of the House of Commons
The Viscount  Jowitt: Lord High Chancellor of Great Britain
Arthur Greenwood: Lord Keeper of the Privy Seal
Hugh Dalton: Chancellor of the Exchequer
Ernest Bevin: Secretary of State for Foreign Affairs
James Chuter Ede: Secretary of State for the Home Department
George Hall: Secretary of State for the Colonies
The Viscount Addison: Secretary of State for Dominion Affairs and Leader of the House of Lords
The Lord Pethick-Lawrence: Secretary of State for India and Burma
A. V. Alexander: First Lord of the Admiralty
Jack Lawson: Secretary of State for War
The Viscount Stansgate: Secretary of State for Air
Ellen Wilkinson: Minister of Education
Joseph Westwood: Secretary of State for Scotland
Tom Williams: Minister of Agriculture and Fisheries
George Isaacs: Minister of Labour and National Service
Aneurin Bevan: Minister of Health
Sir Stafford Cripps: President of the Board of Trade
Emanuel Shinwell: Minister of Fuel and Power

Changes

July 1946 – Arthur Greenwood becomes Paymaster General as well as Lord Privy Seal.
October 1946 – The three service ministers (Secretary of State for War, Secretary of State for Air, and First Lord of the Admiralty) cease to be cabinet positions. A. V. Alexander remains in the cabinet as Minister without Portfolio. George Hall replaces A. V. Alexander as First Lord of the Admiralty, outside the cabinet. Arthur Creech Jones succeeds Hall as Secretary of State for the Colonies.
December 1946 – A. V. Alexander succeeds Attlee as Minister of Defence.
February 1947 – George Tomlinson succeeds Ellen Wilkinson as Minister of Education upon her death.
March 1947 – Arthur Greenwood ceases to be Paymaster General, remaining Lord Privy Seal. His successor as Paymaster General is not in the cabinet.
April 1947 – Arthur Greenwood becomes Minister without Portfolio. Lord Inman succeeds Arthur Greenwood as Lord Privy Seal. William Francis Hare, Lord Listowel succeeds Lord Pethick-Lawrence as Secretary of State for India and Burma.
July 1947 – The Dominion Affairs Office becomes the Office of Commonwealth Relations. Lord Addison remains at the head.
August 1947 – The India and Burma Office becomes the Burma Office with India's independence. Lord Listowel remains in office. Responsibility for relations with India and Pakistan themselves are transferred to Addison and the Commonwealth Relations Office.
September 1947 – Sir Stafford Cripps becomes Minister of Economic Affairs. Harold Wilson succeeds Cripps as President of the Board of Trade. Arthur Greenwood retires from the Front Bench.
October 1947 – Lord Addison succeeds Lord Inman as Lord Privy Seal, remaining also Leader of the House of Lords. Philip Noel-Baker succeeds Lord Addison as Secretary of State for Commonwealth Relations. Arthur Woodburn succeeds Joseph Westwood as Secretary of State for Scotland. The Minister of Fuel and Power, Emanuel Shinwell, leaves the Cabinet.
November 1947 – Sir Stafford Cripps succeeds Hugh Dalton as Chancellor of the Exchequer.
January 1948 – The Burma Office is abolished with Burma's independence.
May 1948 – Hugh Dalton re-enters the Cabinet as Chancellor of the Duchy of Lancaster. Lord Pakenham enters the Cabinet as Minister of Civil Aviation.
July 1948 – Lord Addison becomes Paymaster General.
April 1949 – Lord Addison ceases to be Paymaster General, remaining Lord Privy Seal and Leader of the House of Lords. His successor as Paymaster General is not in the Cabinet.

Second Attlee ministry

1950–1951
Clement Attlee: Prime Minister
Herbert Morrison: Deputy Prime Minister, Lord President of the Council and Leader of the House of Commons
The Viscount Jowitt: Lord High Chancellor of Great Britain
The Viscount Addison: Leader of the House of Lords and Lord Keeper of the Privy Seal
Sir Stafford Cripps: Chancellor of the Exchequer
Ernest Bevin: Secretary of State for Foreign Affairs
James Chuter Ede: Secretary of State for the Home Department
Jim Griffiths: Secretary of State for the Colonies
Patrick Gordon Walker: Secretary of State for Commonwealth Relations
Harold Wilson: President of the Board of Trade
The Viscount Alexander of Hillsborough: Chancellor of the Duchy of Lancaster
George Tomlinson: Minister of Education
Hector McNeil: Secretary of State for Scotland
Tom Williams: Minister of Agriculture and Fisheries
George Isaacs: Minister of Labour and National Service
Aneurin Bevan: Minister of Health
Emanuel Shinwell: Minister of Defence
Hugh Dalton: Minister of Town and Country Planning

Changes

October 1950: Hugh Gaitskell succeeds Sir Stafford Cripps as Chancellor of the Exchequer.
January 1951: Aneurin Bevan succeeds George Isaacs as Minister of Labour and National service. Bevan's successor as Minister of Health is not in the cabinet. Hugh Dalton's post is renamed Minister of Local Government and Planning.
March 1951: Herbert Morrison succeeds Ernest Bevin as Foreign Secretary. Lord Addison succeeds Morrison as Lord President. Bevin succeeds Addison as Lord Privy Seal. James Chuter Ede succeeds Morrison as Leader of the House of Commons whilst remaining Home Secretary.
April 1951: Richard Stokes succeeds Ernest Bevin (deceased) as Lord Privy Seal. Alf Robens succeeds Aneurin Bevan (resigned) as Minister of Labour and National Service. Sir Hartley Shawcross succeeds Harold Wilson (resigned) as President of the Board of Trade.

List of ministers
Members of the Cabinet are in bold face.

Major legislation enacted

 Law Reform (Contributory Negligence) Act 1945
 Housing (Financial and Miscellaneous Provisions) Act 1946
 Coal Industry Nationalisation Act 1946
 Furnished Houses (Rent Control) Act 1946
 National Health Service Act 1946
 National Insurance Act 1946
 National Insurance (Industrial Injuries) Act 1946
 New Towns Act 1946
 Trade Disputes and Trade Unions Act 1946
 Hill Farming Act 1946
 Agriculture Act 1947
 Pensions (Increase) Act 1947
 Electricity Act 1947
 Town and Country Planning Act 1947
 Transport Act 1947
 National Assistance Act 1948
 Children Act 1948
 Factories Act 1948
 Education (Miscellaneous Provisions) Act 1948
 Agricultural Holdings Act 1948
 Employment and Training Act 1948
 Nurseries and Child-Minders Regulation Act 1948
 Law Reform (Personal Injuries) Act 1948
 Local Government Act 1948
 Representation of the People Act 1948
 Housing Act 1949
 Superannuation Act 1949
 House of Commons (Redistribution of Seats) Act 1949
 Landlord and Tenant (Rent Control) Act 1949
 Lands Tribunal Act 1949
 Legal Aid and Advice Act 1949
 Adoption of Children Act 1949
 Marriage Act 1949
 National Parks and Access to the Countryside Act 1949
 Parliament Act 1949
 Representation of the People Act 1949
 Distribution of Industry Act 1950
 Coal-Mining (Subsidence) Act 1950
 Allotments Act 1950
 Workmen's Compensation (Supplementation) Act 1951

See also
 List of nationalizations by country#United Kingdom

Notes

Further reading
 Bew, John. Clement Attlee: The Man Who Made Modern Britain (2017), comprehensive scholarly biography.
 Brady, Robert A. Crisis in Britain: Plans and Achievements of the Labour Government. (1950), 730pp, highly detailed coverage of each nationalization project Social Security, health programmes, and other domestic policies. excerpt
 Butler, David and G. Butler, Twentieth Century British Political Facts 1900–2000.
 Childs, David. Britain since 1945: A Political History (2012) excerpt and text search
 French, David. Army, Empire, and Cold War: The British Army and Military Policy, 1945–1971 (Oxford University Press, 2012).
 Hennessy, Peter. Never Again: Britain, 1945–1951 (1994).
 Hennessey, Thomas. Britain's Korean War: Cold War diplomacy, strategy and security 1950–1953 (Oxford University Press, 2015).
 
 Kynaston, David. Austerity Britain, 1945–1951 (2008) excerpt and text search, social history
 Morgan, Kenneth O. Labour in Power 1945–1951 (Oxford University Press, 1984)
 Ovendale, R. ed. The foreign policy of the British Labour governments, 1945–1951 (1984).
 Pelling, Henry. "The 1945 general election reconsidered". Historical Journal 23#2 (1980): 399–414. in JSTOR
 Pelling, Henry. Labour Governments, 1945–1951 (1984) 313pp.
 Reeves, Rachel, and Martin McIvor. "Clement Attlee and the foundations of the British welfare state". Renewal: a Journal of Labour Politics 22#3/4 (2014): 42+. online 
 Sked, Alan, and Chris Cook. Post-War Britain: A Political History (1979)
 Tomlinson, Jim. Democratic Socialism and Economic Policy: The Attlee Years, 1945–1951 (2002)  Excerpt and text search
 Williamson, Adrian. "The Bullock Report on Industrial Democracy and the Post-War Consensus." Contemporary British History 30#1 (2016): 119–149.

Ministry
1940s in the United Kingdom
1945 establishments in the United Kingdom
1950s in the United Kingdom
1951 disestablishments in the United Kingdom
British ministries
Cabinets disestablished in 1951
Cabinets established in 1945
Government
 
Ministries of George VI
Welfare state in the United Kingdom